Complications of pregnancy are health problems that are related to pregnancy. Complications that occur primarily during childbirth are termed obstetric labor complications, and problems that occur primarily after childbirth are termed puerperal disorders. Severe complications of pregnancy, childbirth, and the puerperium are present in 1.6% of mothers in the US, and in 1.5% of mothers in Canada.  In the immediate postpartum period (puerperium), 87% to 94% of women report at least one health problem. Long-term health problems (persisting after six months postpartum) are reported by 31% of women.

In 2016, complications of pregnancy, childbirth, and the puerperium resulted globally in 230,600 deaths, down from 377,000 deaths in 1990. The most common causes of maternal mortality are maternal bleeding, postpartum infections including maternal sepsis, hypertensive diseases of pregnancy, obstructed labor, and pregnancy with abortive outcome, which includes miscarriage, ectopic pregnancy, and elective abortion.

A complication of pregnancy is gestational diabetes, and the rising trend of obesity in females makes this a risk factor for its development. Obesity is also a risk factor for pre-eclampsia. There is no clear distinction between complications of pregnancy and symptoms and discomforts of pregnancy. However, the latter do not significantly interfere with activities of daily living or pose any significant threat to the health of the mother or baby. Still, in some cases, the same basic feature can manifest as either a discomfort or a complication depending on the severity. For example, mild nausea may merely be a discomfort (morning sickness), but if severe and with vomiting causing water-electrolyte imbalance it can be classified as a pregnancy complication (hyperemesis gravidarum).

Maternal problems
The following problems originate in the mother, however, they may have serious consequences for the fetus as well.

Gestational diabetes 
Gestational diabetes is when a woman, without a previous diagnosis of diabetes, develops high blood sugar levels during pregnancy. There are many non-modifiable and modifiable risk factors that lead to the devopment of this complication. Non-modifiable risk factors include a family history of diabetes, advanced maternal age, and ethnicity. Modifiable risk factors include maternal obesity. There is an elevated demand for insulin during pregnancy which leads to increased insulin production from pancreatic beta cells.  The elevated demand is a result of increased maternal calorie intake and weight gain, and increased production of prolactin and growth hormone. Gestational diabetes increases risk for further maternal and fetal complications such as development of pre-eclampsia, need for cesarean delivery, preterm delivery, polyhydramnios, macrosomia, shoulder dystocia, fetal hypoglycemia, hyperbilirubinemia, and admission into the neonatal intensive care unit. The increased risk is correlated with the how well the gestational diabetes is controlled during pregnancy with poor control associated with worsened outcomes. A multidisciplinary approach is used to treat gestational diabetes and involves monitoring of blood-glucose levels, nutritional and dietary modifications, lifestyle changes such as increasing physical activity, maternal weight management, and medication such as insulin.

Hyperemesis gravidarum 
Hyperemesis gravidarum is the presence of severe and persistent vomiting, causing dehydration and weight loss. It is similar although more severe than the common morning sickness. It is estimated to affect 0.3–3.6% of pregnant women and is the greatest contributor to hospitalizations under 20 weeks of gestation. Most often, nausea and vomiting symptoms during pregnancy resolve in the first trimester, however, some continue to experience symptoms. Hyperemesis gravidarum is diagnosed by the following criteria: greater than 3 vomiting episodes per day, ketonuria, and weight loss of more than 3 kg or 5% of body weight. There are several non-modifiable and modifiable risk factors that predispose women to development of this condition such as female fetus, psychiatric illness history, high or low BMI pre-pregnancy, young age, African American or Asian ethnicity, type I diabetes, multiple pregnancies, and history of pregnancy affected by hyperemesis gravidarum. There are currently no known mechanisms for the cause of this condition. This complication can cause nutritional deficiency, low pregnancy weight gain, dehydration, and vitamin, electrolyte, and acid-based disturbances in the mother. It has been shown to cause low birth weight, small gestational age, preterm birth, and poor APGAR scores in the infant. Treatments for this condition focus on preventing harm to the fetus while improving symptoms and commonly include fluid replacement and consumption of small, frequent, bland meals. First-line treatments include ginger and acupuncture. Second-line treatments include vitamin B6 +/- doxylamine, antihistamines, dopamine antagonists, and serotonin antagonists. Third-line treatments include corticosteroids, transdermal clonidine, and gabapentin. Treatments chosen are dependent on severity of symptoms and response to therapies.

Pelvic girdle pain
Pelvic girdle pain (PGP) disorder is pain in the area between the posterior iliac crest and gluteal fold beginning peri or postpartum caused by instability and limitation of mobility. It is associated with pubic symphysis pain and sometimes radiation of pain down the hips and thighs. For most pregnant individuals, PGP resolves within three months following delivery, but for some it can last for years, resulting in a reduced tolerance for weight bearing activities. PGP affects around 45% of individuals during pregnancy: 25% report serious pain and 8% are severely disabled. Risk factors for complication development include multiparity, increased BMI, physically strenuous work, smoking, distress, history of back and pelvic trauma, and previous history of pelvic and lower back pain. This syndrome results from a growing uterus during pregnancy that causes increased stress on the lumbar and pelvic regions of the mother, thereby, resulting in postural changes and reduced lumbopelvic muscle strength leading to pelvic instability and pain. It is unclear whether specific hormones in pregnancy are associated with complication development. PGP can result in poor quality of life, predisposition to chronic pain syndrome, extended leave from work, and psychosocial distress. Many treatment options are available based on symptom severity. Non-invasive treatment options include activity modification, pelvic support garments, analgesia with or without short periods of bed rest, and physiotherapy to increase strength of gluteal and adductor muscles reducing stress on the lumbar spine. Invasive surgical management is considered a last-line treatment if all other treatment modalities have failed and symptoms are severe.

High blood pressure

Potential severe hypertensive states of pregnancy are mainly:
 Pre-eclampsia – gestational hypertension, proteinuria (>300 mg), and edema. Severe pre-eclampsia involves a BP over 160/110 (with additional signs). It affects 5–8% of pregnancies.
 Eclampsia – seizures in a pre-eclamptic patient, affect around 1.4% of pregnancies.
 Gestational hypertension can develop after 20 weeks but has no other symptoms, and later rights itself, but it can develop into pre-eclampsia.
 HELLP syndrome – Hemolytic anemia, elevated liver enzymes and a low platelet count. Incidence is reported as 0.5–0.9% of all pregnancies.
 Acute fatty liver of pregnancy is sometimes included in the pre-eclamptic spectrum. It occurs in approximately one in 7,000 to one in 15,000 pregnancies.

Venous thromboembolism
Deep vein thrombosis (DVT), a form of venous thromboembolism (VTE), has an incidence of 0.5 to 7 per 1,000 pregnancies, and is the second most common cause of maternal death in developed countries after bleeding.
 Caused by: Pregnancy-induced hypercoagulability as a physiological response in preparation for the potential bleeding during childbirth.
 Treatment: Prophylactic treatment, e.g. with low molecular weight heparin may be indicated when there are additional risk factors for deep vein thrombosis.

Anemia
Levels of hemoglobin are lower in the third trimesters. According to the United Nations (UN) estimates, approximately half of pregnant individuals develop anemia worldwide. Anemia prevalences during pregnancy differed from 18% in developed countries to 75% in South Asia.

Treatment varies due to the severity of the anaemia, and can be used by increasing iron containing foods, oral iron tablets or by the use of parenteral iron.

Infection

A pregnant woman is more susceptible to certain infections. This increased risk is caused by an increased immune tolerance in pregnancy to prevent an immune reaction against the fetus, as well as secondary to maternal physiological changes including a decrease in respiratory volumes and urinary stasis due to an enlarging uterus. Pregnant individuals are more severely affected by, for example, influenza, hepatitis E, herpes simplex and malaria. The evidence is more limited for coccidioidomycosis, measles, smallpox, and varicella. Mastitis, or inflammation of the breast, occurs in 20% of lactating individuals.

Some infections are vertically transmissible, meaning that they can affect the child as well.

Peripartum cardiomyopathy 
Peripartum cardiomyopathy is a heart failure caused by a decrease in left ventricular ejection fraction (LVEF) to <45% which occurs towards the end of pregnancy or a few months postpartum. Symptoms include shortness of breath in various positions and/or with exertion, fatigue, pedal edema, and chest tightness. Risk factors associated with the development of this complication include maternal age over 30 years, multi gestational pregnancy, family history of cardiomyopathy, previous diagnosis of cardiomyopathy, pre-eclampsia, hypertension, and African ancestry. The pathogenesis of peripartum cardiomyopathy is not yet known, however, it is suggested that multifactorial potential causes could include autoimmune processes, viral myocarditis, nutritional deficiencies, and maximal cardiovascular changes during which increase cardiac preload. Peripartum cardiomyopathy can lead to many complications such as cardiopulmonary arrest, pulmonary edema, thromboembolisms, brain injury, and death. Treatment of this condition is very similar to treatment of non-gravid heart failure patients, however, safety of the fetus must be prioritized. For example, for anticoagulation due to increased risk for thromboembolism, low molecular weight heparin which is safe for use during pregnancy is used instead of warfarin which crosses the placenta.

Hypothyroidism

Hypothyroidism (commonly caused by Hashimoto's disease) is an autoimmune disease that affects the thyroid by causing low thyroid hormone levels. Symptoms of hypothyroidism can include low energy, cold intolerance, muscle cramps, constipation, and memory and concentration problems. It is diagnosed by the presence of elevated levels of thyroid stimulation hormone or TSH. Patients with elevated TSH and decreased levels of free thyroxine or T4 are considered to have overt hypothyroidism. While those with elevated TSH and normal levels of free T4 are considered to have subclinical hypothyroidism. Risk factors for developing hypothyroidism during pregnancy include iodine deficiency, history of thyroid disease, visible goiter, hypothyroidism symptoms, family history of thyroid disease, history of type 1 diabetes or autoimmune conditions, and history of infertility or fetal loss. Various hormones during pregnancy affect the thyroid and increase thyroid hormone demand. For example, during pregnancy, there is increased urinary iodine excretion as well as increased thyroxine binding globulin and thyroid hormone degradation which all increase thyroid hormone demands. This condition can have a profound effect during pregnancy on the mother and fetus. The infant may be seriously affected and have a variety of birth defects. Complications in the mother and fetus can include pre-eclampsia, anemia, miscarriage, low birth weight, still birth, congestive heart failure, impaired neurointellectual development, and if severe, congenital iodine deficiency syndrome. This complication is treated by iodine supplementation, levothyroxine which is a form of thyroid hormone replacement, and close monitoring of thyroid function.

Fetal and placental problems
The following problems occur in the fetus or placenta, but may have serious consequences on the mother as well.

Ectopic pregnancy
Ectopic pregnancy is implantation of the embryo outside the uterus
 Caused by: Unknown, but risk factors include smoking, advanced maternal age, and prior surgery or trauma to the fallopian tubes.
 Risk factors include untreated pelvic inflammatory disease, likely due to fallopian tube scarring.
 Treatment: In most cases, keyhole surgery must be carried out to remove the fetus, along with the fallopian tube. If the pregnancy is very early, it may resolve on its own, or it can be treated with methotrexate, an abortifacient.

Miscarriage 
Miscarriage is the loss of a pregnancy prior to 20 weeks.  In the UK, miscarriage is defined as the loss of a pregnancy during the first 23 weeks.

Approximately 80% of pregnancy loss occurs in the first trimester, with a decrease in risk after 12 weeks gestation. Spontaneous abortions can be further categorized into complete, inevitable, missed, and threatened abortions:
 Complete: Vaginal bleeding occurs followed by the complete passing of conception products through the cervix.  
 Inevitable: Vaginal bleeding occurs; the cervical os is closed indicating that conception products will pass in the near future.
 Missed: Vaginal bleeding occurs and some products of conception may have passed through the cervix; the cervical os is closed and ultrasound shows a nonviable fetus and remaining products of conception.
 Threatened: Vaginal bleeding occurs; the cervical os is closed and ultrasound shows a viable fetus.

Stillbirth
Stillbirth is defined as fetal loss or death after 20 weeks gestation. Early stillbirth is between 20 and 27 weeks gestation, while late stillbirth is between 28 and 36 weeks gestation. A term stillbirth is when the fetus dies 37 weeks and above.
 Epidemiology: There are over 2 million stillbirths a year and there are about 6 stillbirths per 1000 births (0.6%)
 Clinical presentation: Fetal behavioral changes like decreased movements or a loss in fetal sensation may indicate stillbirth, but the presentation can vary greatly.
 Risk factors: Maternal weight, age, and smoking, as well as pre-existing maternal diabetes or hypertension
 Treatment: If fetal passing occurs before labor, treatment options include induced labor or cesarean section. Otherwise, stillbirths can pass with natural birth.

Placental abruption
Placental abruption defined as the separation of the placenta from the uterus prior to delivery, is a major cause of third trimester vaginal bleeding and complicates about 1% of pregnancies.
 Clinical Presentation: Varies widely from asymptomatic to vaginal bleeding and abdominal pain.
 Risk factors: Prior abruption, smoking, trauma, cocaine use, multifetal gestation, hypertension, preeclampsia, thrombophilias, advanced maternal age, preterm premature rupture of membranes, intrauterine infections, and hydroamnios.
 Treatment: Immediate delivery if the fetus is mature (36 weeks or older), or if a younger fetus or the mother is in distress. In less severe cases with immature fetuses, the situation may be monitored in hospital, with treatment if necessary.

Placenta previa 
Placenta previa is a condition that occurs when the placenta fully or partially covers the cervix. Placenta previa can be further categorized into complete previa, partial previa, marginal previa, and low-lying placenta, depending on the degree to which the placenta covers the internal cervical os. Placenta previa is diagnosed by ultrasound, either during a routine examination or following an episode of abnormal vaginal bleeding. Most diagnosis of placenta previa occurs during the second-trimester.
 Risk Factors: prior cesarean delivery, pregnancy termination, intrauterine surgery, smoking, multifetal gestation, increasing parity, maternal age.

Placenta accreta 
Placenta accreta is an abnormal adherence of the placenta to the uterine wall. Specifically, placenta accreta involves abnormal adherence of the placental trophoblast to the uterine myometrium.

Placenta accreta risk factors include placenta previa, abnormally elevated second-trimester AFP and free β-hCG levels, and advanced gestational parent age, specifically over the age of 35. Furthermore, prior cesarean delivery is one of the most common risk factors for placenta accreta, due to the presence of a uterine scar leading to abnormal decidualization of the placenta.

Due to abnormal adherence of the placenta to the uterine wall, cesarean delivery is often indicated, as well as cesarean hysterectomy.

Multiple pregnancies

Multiple births  may become monochorionic, sharing the same chorion, with resultant risk of twin-to-twin transfusion syndrome. Monochorionic multiples may even become monoamniotic, sharing the same amniotic sac, resulting in risk of umbilical cord compression and entanglement. In very rare cases, there may be conjoined twins, possibly impairing function of internal organs.

Mother-to-child transmission

Since the embryo and fetus have little or no immune function, they depend on the immune function of their mother. Several pathogens can cross the placenta and cause (perinatal) infection. Often microorganisms that produce minor illness in the mother are very dangerous for the developing embryo or fetus. This can result in spontaneous abortion or major developmental disorders. For many infections, the baby is more at risk at particular stages of pregnancy. Problems related to perinatal infection are not always directly noticeable.

The term TORCH complex refers to a set of several different infections that may be caused by transplacental infection:
 T - Toxoplasmosis
 O - other infections (i.e. Parvovirus B19, Coxsackievirus, Chickenpox, Chlamydia, HIV, HTLV, syphilis, Zika)
 R - Rubella
 C - Cytomegalovirus
 H - HSV

Babies can also become infected by their mother during birth. During birth, babies are exposed to maternal blood and body fluids without the placental barrier intervening and to the maternal genital tract. Because of this, blood-borne microorganisms (hepatitis B, HIV), organisms associated with sexually transmitted disease (e.g., gonorrhoea and chlamydia), and normal fauna of the genito-urinary tract (e.g., Candida) are among those commonly seen in infection of newborns.

General risk factors 
Factors increasing the risk (to either the pregnant individual, the fetus/es, or both) of pregnancy complications beyond the normal level of risk may be present in the pregnant individual's medical profile either before they become pregnant or during the pregnancy. These pre-existing factors may related to the individual's genetics, physical or mental health, their environment and social issues, or a combination of those.

Biological 
Some common biological risk factors include:
 Age of either parent
 Adolescent parents: Young mothers are at an increased risk of developing certain complications, including preterm birth and low infant birth weight.
 Older parents: As they age, both mothers and fathers are at an increased risk for complications in the fetus and during pregnancy and childbirth. Complications for those 45 or older include increased risk of primary Caesarean delivery (i.e. C-section).
 Height: Pregnancy in individuals whose height is less than 1.5 meters (5 feet) correlates with a higher incidence of preterm birth and underweight babies. Also, these individuals are more likely to have a small pelvis, which can result in such complications during childbirth as shoulder dystocia.
 Weight
 Low weight: Individuals whose pre-pregnancy weight is less than 45.5 kilograms (100 pounds) are more likely to have underweight babies.
 High weight: Obese individuals are more likely to have very large babies, potentially increasing difficulties in childbirth. Obesity also increases the chances of developing gestational diabetes, high blood pressure, preeclampsia, experiencing postterm pregnancy and requiring a cesarean delivery.
 Pre-existing disease in pregnancy, or an acquired disease: A disease and condition not necessarily directly caused by the pregnancy.
 Diabetes mellitus in pregnancy
 Lupus in pregnancy
 Thyroid disease in pregnancy
 Risks arising from previous pregnancies: Complications experienced during a previous pregnancy are more likely to recur.
 Multiple pregnancies: Individuals who have had greater than five previous pregnancies face increased risks of rapid labor and excessive bleeding after delivery.
 Multiple gestation (having more than one fetus in a single pregnancy): These individuals have an increased risk of mislocated placenta.

Environmental 
Some common environmental risk factors during pregnancy include:
 Exposure to environmental toxins
 Ionizing radiation
 Exposure to recreational drugs
 Alcohol: Use during pregnancy can cause fetal alcohol syndrome and fetal alcohol spectrum disorder.
 Tobacco use: During pregnancy, causes twice the risk of premature rupture of membranes, placental abruption and placenta previa. Also, it increases the odds of the baby being born prematurely by 30%.
 Prenatal cocaine exposure: Associated with premature birth, birth defects and attention deficit disorder.
 Prenatal methamphetamine exposure: Can cause premature birth and congenital abnormalities. Other investigations have revealed short-term neonatal outcomes to include small deficits in infant neurobehavioral function and growth restriction when compared to control infants. Also, prenatal methamphetamine use is believed to have long-term effects in terms of brain development, which may last for many years.
 Cannabis: Possibly associated with adverse effects on the child later in life.
 Social and socioeconomic factors: Generally speaking, unmarried individuals and those in lower socioeconomic groups experience an increased level of risk in pregnancy, due at least in part to lack of access to appropriate prenatal care.
 Unintended pregnancy: Unintended pregnancies preclude preconception care and delays prenatal care.  They preclude other preventive care, may disrupt life plans and on average have worse health and psychological outcomes for the mother and, if birth occurs, the child.
 Exposure to pharmaceutical drugs: Certain anti-depressants may increase risks of preterm delivery.

High-risk pregnancy
Some disorders and conditions can mean that pregnancy is considered high-risk (about 6-8% of pregnancies in the USA) and in extreme cases may be contraindicated. High-risk pregnancies are the main focus of doctors specialising in maternal-fetal medicine. Serious pre-existing disorders which can reduce a woman's physical ability to survive pregnancy include a range of congenital defects (that is, conditions with which the woman herself was born, for example, those of the heart or reproductive organs, some of which are listed above) and diseases acquired at any time during the woman's life.

List of complications (complete)
Obstetric complications are those complications that develop during pregnancy. A woman may develop an infection, syndrome or complication that is not unique to pregnancy and that may have existed before pregnancy. Pregnancy often is complicated by preexisting and concurrent conditions. Though these pre-existing and concurrent conditions may have great impact on pregnancy, they are not included in the following list.

 Chromosome abnormalities
 Ectopic pregnancy
 Mendelian disorders
 Spontaneous abortion
 Nonmedelian disorders
 Oligohydramnios
 Hydramnios
 Abnormal labor and delivery
 Chorioamnionitis
 Shoulder dystocia
 Breech delivery
 Prior Cesarean delivery 
 Uterine rupture 
 Hysterectomy after delivery
 Postpartum infection 
 Postpartum depression
 Septic pelvic thrombosis 
 Hypertension 
 Preeclampsia
 Eclampsia
 Placental abruption
 Placenta previa
 Fetal-to-mother hemorrhage
 Rh disease
 Amniotic fluid embolism 
 Delayed delivery
 Fetal death
 Incontinence
 Preterm birth
 Neonatal infection
 Low birth-weight infant
 Premature rupture of membranes
 Incompetent cervix
 Posterm infant
 Fetal growth restriction
 Macrosomia
 Twin pregnancy
 Triplets and more
 Seizures
 Gestational trophoblastic disease
 Gestational diabetes
 Hyperemesis gravidarum
 Pelvic girdle pain
 HELLP syndrome
 Acute fatty liver of pregnancy
 Deep vein thrombosis
 Pregnancy-induced hypercoagulability
 Immune tolerance in pregnancy
 Mastitis
 Peripartum cardiomyopathy
 Vertically transmitted infection
 Postpartum bleeding
 Perineal tear
 Fetal alcohol spectrum disorder
 Thyroid disease in pregnancy
 Pruritic urticarial papules and plaques of pregnancy
 Intrahepatic cholestasis of pregnancy
 Gestational pemphigoid
 Prurigo gestationis
 Lupus
 Cephalopelvic disproportion
 Stillbirth
 Molar pregnancy
 Obstetric fistula
 Uterine incarceration
 Twin to Twin transfusion syndrome
 Gestational trophoblastic disease
 Antiphospholipid antibody syndrome
 Hyperemesis gravidarum
 Acute fatty liver of pregnancy
 Gestational diabetes
 Hemoglobinopathies
 Postpartum thyroiditis
 Postpartum depression
 Hyperpigmentation
 Hair growth changes
 Herpes gestationitis
 Pruritic urticarial papaules of pregnancy
 Abnormality of maternal pelvic organs
 Postpartum acute renal failure
 Postpartum nephritis
 Haemorrhoids in pregnancy
 Obstetric embolism
 Pregnancy-related peripheral neuritis
 Obstetrical tetanus
 Unicornuate uterus
 Maternal death
 Arcuate uterus

See also 
 List of complications of pregnancy
 List of obstetric topics
 Dermatoses of pregnancy
 Thyroid in pregnancy
 Reproductive Health Supplies Coalition

References

Bibliography

External links 

Women's health

sv:Graviditet#Möjliga komplikationer